SDE Sea Wave is a type of renewable energy power plant technology utilizing sea wave energy for the production of electricity.

Description
The device is made of horizontal buoys, one end of which is attached to a breakwater, or on some other sea-based structure, which create a vertical motion, according to the frequency of the sea wave. The buoys' movement presses on a hydraulic liquid, which is regulated by systems that convert the energy into circular systems. These systems operate an electricity generator and the process culminates in electricity production. The system's innovation is based on its self-correcting mechanism whereby, should a large wave overwhelm the buoy, it would flip over and then "wait" for a lower tide to flip back. The system's high survivability capability is based on the fact that only 10% of its components are submerged in sea water.

Developer
The device is developed by Israeli company S.D.E. Energy LTD.  S.D.E. has built and tested twelve different models of its system, culminating with a full-scale model that operated and tested in Jaffa Port near Tel Aviv in Israel and produced 40 kW for a period of a year.

In March, 2010, S.D.E. is looking at building a 250 kW model also in the port of Jaffa near Tel Aviv, and planning to construct a 100 MW power plant as one of its projects in the islands of Kosrae, Micronesia and Zanzibar.

References

External links 

 S.D.E. ENERGY LTD. official site
  SDE in Peswiki

Wave farms
Electric power companies of Israel
Power station technology